Objecteering is a UML and MDA CASE tool edited by Objecteering Software, a subsidiary of Softeam.

Overview 
Objecteering is available in two versions:
 The Free Edition of Objecteering 6 is a UML 2.0 modeling tool free of charge but restricted to single-user mode. This version is a high level and complete UML2 modeling tool, including document generation. Users can also try out several Objecteering 6 extension modules, such as Requirements Management, Documentation, C# Developer, C++ Developer or Java Developer, one at a time.
 The Enterprise Edition is the commercial edition of Objecteering 6 that provides access to the full product line either in stand-alone mode with some cooperative development capabilities or in full teamwork mode, allowing concurrent modeling and development facilities through a multi-user repository, model diff/merge operations and plug-ins to the most popular CM tools used in model versioning and configuration management. In addition to its UML 2.0 modeling capabilities, Objecteering 6 Enterprise Edition fully supports requirements management integrated with UML, report and documentation production, and code generation for Java, C++, C#, SQL DDL, CORBA IDL and Fortran. An Eclipse plug-in is also available with Objecteering 6.

Key features 

 OMG standard modeling (UML2, BPMN, SysML, MDA, …)
 Ergonomy and productivity in model and diagram construction
 Dictionary and requirement management integrated into modeling
 Semantic diagram editor, real-time model consistency checking
 Permanent consistency and traceability (requirements, models, documentation, code, …)
 Central model repository (business, logical, technical, software, physical, …)
 Collaborative and teamwork management (multi-user, multi-project)
 Automated application code production (Java, C#, C++, SQL, …)
 Easy adaptation and extension of Objecteering using MDA technology (UML profiles, Java API and transformation wizards, model transformation, MDA components, …)
 Extensibility and openness: Java API, integration with third-party tools (SCM, RME, IDE, …)

See also
List of Unified Modeling Language tools
Model-driven engineering
Object Management Group

References

External links
 Objecteering Software

UML tools